Gangsta Conversation is the fifth studio album by American rap group South Central Cartel.

Track listing 
 Do Ya Thang
 Crucial
 Pretty Bitch
 Still Saggin'
 Mucho Ye'llo
 My N.I.G.G.A.Z.
 Baby I Gee (featuring Kurupt)
 Dirty South Central
 Slumped out
 Rap Nigga
 Bacc Yard
 Low-Low
 1/2 Ass Geez (featuring Jayo Felony)
 Thug Disease (featuring C-Bo and Spice 1)
 Pussy Don't Pay Bills
 Get Your Hands Out of My Pockets
 Gangsta Boogie

2001 albums
South Central Cartel albums
Albums produced by Prodeje